This is the discography documenting albums and singles released by American R&B/soul male vocal group The Spinners.

Albums

Studio albums

Live albums

Compilation albums

Singles

 Credited as Bobby Smith & the Spinners.

References

External links

Discographies of American artists
Rhythm and blues discographies
Discography